Wendel may refer to:

People
 Wendel (name), including a list of people with the name
 Wendel (footballer, born 1981), full name Wendel Santana Pereira Santos, Brazilian football defensive midfielder and wingback
 Wendel (footballer, born 1982), full name Wendel Geraldo Maurício e Silva, Brazilian football midfielder
 Wendel (footballer, born 1984), full name Wendel Raul Gonçalves Gomes, Brazilian football defensive midfielder
 Wendel (footballer, born 1991), full name Wendel Alex dos Santos, Brazilian football attacking midfielder
 Wendel (footballer, born 1997), full name Marcus Wendel Valle da Silva, Brazilian football midfielder
 Wendel (footballer, born 2000), full name Wendel da Silva Costa, Brazilian football forward
 Wendel (footballer, born 2001), full name Wendel da Silva Ramos, Brazilian football midfielder

Other uses
 Wendel (group), a French private equity group
 Wendel, California, unincorporated community in Lassen County
 Wendel, a gay comic strip by Howard Cruse which appeared in The Advocate from 1983 to 1989

See also

 Wendell (disambiguation)
 Vendel, parish in the county of Uppland, Sweden
 de Wendel family, a family of industrialists from Lorraine, France
 Wandal (disambiguation)
 Hans Wendl